Beading may refer to:
 Craftwork using beads or Beadwork
 Architectural mouldings, for which see Molding (decorative)